The 2018–19 Conference USA men's basketball season began with practices in October 2018, followed by the start of the 2018–19 NCAA Division I men's basketball season in November. Conference play began in late December and concluded in early March.

Old Dominion won the C-USA regular season championship by two games. The conference used a regular season schedule format which the conference hoped will increase NCAA Tournament berths. whereby the 14 teams played each other once with a second game for travel partners in the first seven weeks of C-USA play. After those 14 games, the league standings determined the matchups for the rest of the regular season. The teams were divided into two groups of five (teams in first through fifth place and 6–10) and a group of four (11–14). During the final three weeks, teams played within their respective grouping for the last four games of conference play. Home and away games within the groups were determined by a preset formula. C-USA Commissioner Judy MacLeod said that "With the goals to improve seeding and increase the number of teams that advance to the postseason, we viewed this as a great opportunity to enhance our top teams' resumes by providing them additional quality games within their conference schedule."

The C-USA tournament was held from March 13–16, 2019 at The Ford Center at The Star in Frisco, Texas. Old Dominion defeated Western Kentucky in the Tournament championship game. As a result Old Dominion received the conference's automatic bid to the NCAA tournament. No other C-USA teams received an NCAA Tournament bid.

Head coaches

Coaching changes 
Following a loss to Lamar on November 27, 2017 that saw UTEP drop to 1–5 on the season, head coach Tim Floyd announced that he was retiring effective immediately. The school had previously announced a new athletic director, Jim Senter, a week prior, but Floyd said that had nothing to do with his decision. Assistant Phil Johnson was named interim head coach of the Miners the next day. On March 12, 2018, the school hired Fresno State head coach Rodney Terry as the new head coach of the Miners.

On December 14, 2017, head coach Mark Price was fired by Charlotte after a 3–6 start to the season and was replaced by Houston Fancher. Houston Fancher was named interim coach for the remainder of the season. On March 6, 2018, new athletic director Mike Hill fired Fancher. On March 19, the school hired Virginia associate head coach Ron Sanchez as the school's new head coach.

March 16, 2018, Florida Atlantic head coach Michael Curry was fired after four seasons. On March 22, it was announced that the school had hired Florida assistant head coach Dusty May as head coach.

Middle Tennessee head coach Kermit Davis left the school on March 19, 2018 to accept the head coaching job at Ole Miss. On March 24, the Blue Raiders named UNC Asheville head coach Nick McDevitt as the team's new head coach.

On April 2, 2018, FIU fired head coach Anthony Evans after five seasons. On April 20, the school announced VCU associate head coach Jeremy Ballard was hired as the new head coach.

Coaches 

Notes: 
 All records, appearances, titles, etc. are from time with current school only. 
 Year at school includes 2018–19 season.
 Overall and C-USA records are from time at current school and are through the end of the 2018–19 season.

Preseason

Preseason Coaches Poll
Source

() first place votes

Preseason All-C-USA Team
Source

Regular season

Conference matrix
This table summarizes the head-to-head results between teams in conference play.

Postseason

C-USA Tournament 

Only the top 12 conference teams were eligible for the tournament. Old Dominion defeated Western Kentucky in the tournament championship game.

* denotes overtime period.

NCAA tournament

References